Walnut Spring is a historic home located near Kanodes Mill, Montgomery County, Virginia.  The house is a large, two-story, gable-roofed, dwelling with a  single pile central passage plan. It was built in the period 1830–1865. It has a long appendage to the rear made up of connected outbuildings. It features gable ends finished with tapered rake boards with decorative sawn ends, and a box cornice detailed with a simple flat, stepped, or corbeled form.

It was listed on the National Register of Historic Places in 1989.

References

Houses on the National Register of Historic Places in Virginia
Houses in Montgomery County, Virginia
National Register of Historic Places in Montgomery County, Virginia